The men's cross-country cycling event at the 2012 Olympic Games in London took place at Hadleigh Farm on 12 August.

Fifty cyclists from 32 countries competed. Jaroslav Kulhavý from the Czech Republic won the gold medal, beating Switzerland's Nino Schurter by one second.

Format
The competition began at 1:30 pm with a mass start and involved a set number of laps (determined the day before the competition) around the 4.8 km course at Hadleigh Farm in Essex. The distance of the race was 34.1 km.

Schedule 
All times are British Summer Time

Result
The entry list was published on 26 July.

References

Cycling at the 2012 Summer Olympics
Cycling at the Summer Olympics – Men's cross-country
2012 in mountain biking
Men's events at the 2012 Summer Olympics